China General Aviation Flight 7552 was a China General Aviation flight from Nanjing Dajiaochang Airport to Xiamen Gaoqi International Airport.

Aircraft 
The aircraft involved was a Yakovlev Yak-42D with registration B-2755 (factory no. 4520422116644, serial no. 14-02). The aircraft was released by the Saratov Aviation Plant on January 2, 1992, and was delivered to China General Aviation in the same month.

Crash 
Flight GP7552 was a passenger flight from Nanking to Xiamen. There were 116 passengers and 10 crew members. At about 3:05 pm the aircraft headed for the runway 06 and, after a minute delay, started its take-off roll. The Yak-42 started to lift off the ground and began to climb, however the aircraft lost control and slammed back down onto the runway. The aircraft then exited the runway, and continued rolling for on the ground . The aircraft then crashed into a two-meter (6.6-foot) fence and exploded. The fuselage broke into three parts, after which a post-crash fire erupted. Part of the wreckage fell into a nearby pond. 8 of the 10 crew members and 100 of the 116 passengers died.

Investigation 
Investigators determined the cause of the crash was an improper horizontal stabilizer setting.

See also 

Thai Airways International Flight 311 – another aviation accident that occurred the same day.
Delta Air Lines Flight 1141
Northwest Airlines Flight 255
Spanair Flight 5022
2011 Lokomotiv Yaroslavl plane crash
Fine Air Flight 101

Notes

References

Aviation accidents and incidents in 1992
Aviation accidents and incidents in China
Accidents and incidents involving the Yakovlev Yak-42
China General Aviation accidents and incidents
1992 disasters in China
July 1992 events in Asia
Aviation accidents and incidents caused by loss of control